The purpose of this article is to serve as an annotated index of various modes of convergence and their logical relationships.  For an expository article, see Modes of convergence.  Simple logical relationships between different modes of convergence are indicated (e.g., if one implies another), formulaically rather than in prose for quick reference, and indepth descriptions and discussions are reserved for their respective articles.

Guide to this index.  To avoid excessive verbiage, note that each of the following types of objects is a special case of types preceding it: sets, topological spaces, uniform spaces, topological abelian groups (TAG), normed vector spaces, Euclidean spaces, and the real/complex numbers.  Also note that any metric space is a uniform space.  Finally,  subheadings will always indicate special cases of their superheadings.

The following is a list of modes of convergence for:

A sequence of elements {an} in a topological space (Y)
 Convergence, or "topological convergence" for emphasis (i.e. the existence of a limit).

...in a uniform space (U)
 Cauchy-convergence

Implications:

  -   Convergence  Cauchy-convergence

  -   Cauchy-convergence and convergence of a subsequence together  convergence.

  -   U is called "complete" if Cauchy-convergence (for nets)  convergence.

Note: A sequence exhibiting Cauchy-convergence is called a cauchy sequence to emphasize that it may not be convergent.

A series of elements Σbk in a TAG (G)
 Convergence (of partial sum sequence)
 Cauchy-convergence (of partial sum sequence)
 Unconditional convergence

Implications:

  -   Unconditional convergence  convergence (by definition).

...in a normed space (N)
 Absolute-convergence (convergence of )

Implications:

  -   Absolute-convergence  Cauchy-convergence  absolute-convergence of some grouping1.

  -   Therefore: N is Banach (complete) if absolute-convergence  convergence.

  -   Absolute-convergence and convergence together  unconditional convergence.

  -   Unconditional convergence  absolute-convergence, even if N is Banach.

  -   If N is a Euclidean space, then unconditional convergence  absolute-convergence.

1 Note: "grouping" refers to a series obtained by grouping (but not reordering) terms of the original series.  A grouping of a series thus corresponds to a subsequence of its partial sums.

A sequence of functions {fn} from a set (S) to a topological space (Y)
 Pointwise convergence

...from a set (S) to a uniform space (U)
 Uniform convergence
 Pointwise Cauchy-convergence
 Uniform Cauchy-convergence

Implications are cases of earlier ones, except:

  -   Uniform convergence  both pointwise convergence and uniform Cauchy-convergence.

  -   Uniform Cauchy-convergence and pointwise convergence of a subsequence  uniform convergence.

...from a topological space (X) to a uniform space (U)
For many "global" modes of convergence, there are corresponding notions of a) "local" and b) "compact" convergence, which are given by requiring convergence to occur a) on some neighborhood of each point, or b) on all compact subsets of X.  Examples:

 Local uniform convergence (i.e. uniform convergence on a neighborhood of each point)
 Compact (uniform) convergence (i.e. uniform convergence on all compact subsets)
 further instances of this pattern below.

Implications:

  -   "Global" modes of convergence imply the corresponding "local" and "compact" modes of convergence.  E.g.:

      Uniform convergence  both local uniform convergence and compact (uniform) convergence.

  -   "Local" modes of convergence tend to imply "compact" modes of convergence.  E.g.,

      Local uniform convergence  compact (uniform) convergence.

  -   If  is locally compact, the converses to such tend to hold:

      Local uniform convergence  compact (uniform) convergence.

...from a measure space (S,μ) to the complex numbers (C) 

 Almost everywhere convergence
 Almost uniform convergence
 Lp convergence
 Convergence in measure
 Convergence in distribution

Implications:

  -   Pointwise convergence  almost everywhere convergence.

  -   Uniform convergence  almost uniform convergence.

  -   Almost everywhere convergence  convergence in measure. (In a finite measure space)

  -   Almost uniform convergence  convergence in measure.

  -   Lp convergence  convergence in measure.

  -   Convergence in measure  convergence in distribution if μ is a probability measure and the functions are integrable.

A series of functions Σgk from a set (S) to a TAG (G)
 Pointwise convergence (of partial sum sequence)
 Uniform convergence (of partial sum sequence)
 Pointwise Cauchy-convergence (of partial sum sequence)
 Uniform Cauchy-convergence (of partial sum sequence)
 Unconditional pointwise convergence
 Unconditional uniform convergence

Implications are all cases of earlier ones.

...from a set (S) to a normed space (N)
 Pointwise absolute-convergence (pointwise convergence of )
 Uniform absolute-convergence (uniform convergence of )
 Normal convergence (convergence of the series of uniform norms )

Implications are cases of earlier ones, except:

  -   Normal convergence  uniform absolute-convergence

...from a topological space (X) to a TAG (G)
 Local uniform convergence (of partial sum sequence)
 Compact (uniform) convergence (of partial sum sequence)

Implications are all cases of earlier ones.

...from a topological space (X) to a normed space (N)
 Local uniform absolute-convergence
 Compact (uniform) absolute-convergence
 Local normal convergence
 Compact normal convergence

Implications (mostly cases of earlier ones):

  -   Uniform absolute-convergence  both local uniform absolute-convergence and compact (uniform) absolute-convergence.

      Normal convergence  both local normal convergence and compact normal convergence.

  -   Local normal convergence  local uniform absolute-convergence.

      Compact normal convergence  compact (uniform) absolute-convergence.

  -   Local uniform absolute-convergence  compact (uniform) absolute-convergence.

      Local normal convergence  compact normal convergence

  -   If X is locally compact:

      Local uniform absolute-convergence  compact (uniform) absolute-convergence.

      Local normal convergence  compact normal convergence

See also 
 Limit of a sequence
 Convergence of measures
 Convergence in measure
 Convergence of random variables: 
 in distribution
 in probability
 almost sure
 sure
 in mean

Convergence (mathematics)